The 1988 United States presidential debates were a series of debates held for the presidential election.

The Commission on Presidential Debates (CPD), a bipartisan organization formed in 1987, organized two debates among the major presidential candidates, sponsored two presidential debates and one vice-presidential debates. Only the Republican nominee George H. W. Bush and the Democratic nominee Michael Dukakis met the criteria for inclusion in the debates, and thus were the only two to appear in the debates sponsored by the Commission on Presidential Debates. The CPD-sponsored vice presidential debate took place between Republican nominee Dan Quayle and Democratic nominee Lloyd Bentsen.

Debate schedule 
There were two presidential debates and one vice-presidential debate.

September 25: First presidential debate (Wake Forest University) 

The First presidential debate was held in the Wait Chapel at Wake Forest University on Sunday September 25, 1988 between vice president George H. W. Bush and governor Michael Dukakis. Jim Lehrer of PBS moderated the debate with John Mashek of Atlanta Constitution, Peter Jennings of ABC, and Anne Groer of Orlando Sentinel as panelists.  Questions divided between foreign and domestic policy.

Voters were split as to who won the first presidential debate.

Transcript 

  from the Commission on Presidential Debates website.

Viewership 
An estimated 65.1 million viewers tuned into the debate.

October 5: Vice presidential debate (Omaha Civic Auditorium) 

The Vice presidential debate was held in the Omaha Civic Auditorium in Omaha, Nebraska on Wednesday, October 5, 1988 between senator Dan Quayle and senator Lloyd Bentsen. Judy Woodruff of PBS moderated the debate with Tom Brokaw of NBC, Jon Margolis of Chicago Tribune, and Brit Hume of ABC.

"Senator, you're no Jack Kennedy" 
Judy Woodruff, set the stage by addressing the audience: "Based on the history since World War II, there is almost a 50–50 chance that one of the two men here tonight will become President of the United States." She was referring to the probability that the man elected vice president would later become president, either by succession or by a presidential bid. In Quayle's response to Woodruff's question he stated "I have as much experience in the Congress as Jack Kennedy did when he sought the presidency." Bentsen then responded to Quayle's remark with "Senator, I served with Jack Kennedy. I knew Jack Kennedy. Jack Kennedy was a friend of mine. Senator, you're no Jack Kennedy'' followed shouts and applause.

Quayle had routinely been comparing himself to Kennedy in his stump speech. Quayle did not directly compare himself with Kennedy in terms of accomplishment, but in terms of length of Congressional service; Quayle served for 12 years while Kennedy served for 14. When Kennedy successfully sought the Democratic nomination in 1960, he had less experience than his primary opponents, most of whom had more seniority in the Senate. While it was a statement of fact, some of Quayle's advisors suggested that this comparison could cause trouble.

Bentsen's remark has become a part of the political lexicon as a way to deflate politicians or other individuals perceived as thinking too highly of themselves. The phrase was almost never uttered, as Bentsen was so nervous that he pleaded with his staff to cancel the debate altogether.

Transcript 

  from the Commission on Presidential Debates website.

Viewership 
An estimated 46.9 million viewers tuned into the debate.

October 13: Second presidential debate (University of California) 
The Second presidential debate was held at the Pauley Pavilion at University of California in Los Angeles, California on Thursday, October 13, 1988 between vice president George H. W. Bush and governor Michael Dukakis. Bernard Shaw of CNN moderated the debate with Andrea Mitchell of NBC, Ann Compton of ABC, Margaret Warner of Newsweek as panelists.

Bush improved in the second debate; Dukakis had been suffering from the flu and spent much of the day in bed. His performance was generally seen as poor.

Kitty Dukakis 
Bernard Shaw opened the debate by asking Dukakis whether he would support the death penalty if Kitty Dukakis, his wife, were raped and murdered; Dukakis answered "no" and proceeded to discuss the statistical ineffectiveness of capital punishment. Some commentators thought the question itself was unfair, in that it injected an overly emotional element into the discussion of a policy issue; Many observers felt Dukakis's answer lacked the normal emotions one would expect of a person talking about a loved one's rape and murder, which played to his reputation of being intellectually cold.

Results 
Tom Brokaw of NBC reported on his October 14 newscast, "The consensus tonight is that Vice President George Bush won last night's debate and made it all the harder for Governor Michael Dukakis to catch and pass him in the 25 days remaining. In all of the Friday morning quarterbacking, there was common agreement that Dukakis failed to seize the debate and make it his night."

Transcript 

  from the Commission on Presidential Debates website.

Viewership 
An estimated 67.3 million viewers tuned into the debate.

References 

United States presidential debates